Je suis un sentimental is a 1955 French crime film directed by John Berry.

Plot 
Barney Morgan is a reporter who works for a French journal. His editor-in-chief Rupert finds his lover Alice murdered. His boss is the main suspect but Barney doesn't believe his boss could possibly be a murderer. Subsequently he tries to prove the man's innocence.

Barney suspects Alice's husband and gathers enough circumstantial evidence to make his point. But the widower's lawyer can prove he didn't do it neither. Barney concedes he was wrong and commences a new investigation.

Digging deeper he discovers something about the journal's publisher and especially about the publisher's son Oliver. While finding the real killer and proving his guilt Barney wins the heart of beautiful Marianne.

Cast 
Eddie Constantine as Barney Morgan
Bella Darvi as Marianne Colas
Olivier Hussenot as Michel Gérard
Walter Chiari as Dédé la Couleuvre
Robert Lombard as Olivier de Villeterre
André Versini as Armand Sylvestre, the comedian
Albert Rémy as Ledoux
 Paul Frankeur  as  Jacques Rupert 
 Aimé Clariond  as Madame de Villeterre 
 Cosetta Greco as  Alice Gérard 
 Albert Dinan  as  Henri
 René Hell  as  Raymond 
 Charles Bouillaud  as Policeman
 Paul Azaïs  as  Inspector
 Jackie Sardou as The concierge

References

External links
 
Je suis un sentimental at “Cinema-francais“ (French)

1955 films
1950s French-language films
1955 crime films
French crime films
Films about journalists
Films directed by John Berry
Italian black-and-white films
Italian crime films
1950s Italian films
1950s French films